Kuhn Nunatak is one of the Rambo Nunataks, lying  southwest of Oliver Nunatak on the west side of Foundation Ice Stream, in the Pensacola Mountains, Antarctica. It was mapped by the United States Geological Survey from surveys and U.S. Navy air photos, 1956–66, and was named by the Advisory Committee on Antarctic Names for Michael H. Kuhn, a meteorologist at Plateau Station, winter 1967.

References

Nunataks of Queen Elizabeth Land